Plant City is an incorporated city in Hillsborough County, Florida, United States, approximately midway between Brandon and Lakeland along Interstate 4. The population was 39,764 at the 2020 census.

Despite many thinking it was named for flora grown at plant nurseries (especially vegetables and fruits, as well as tropical houseplants) in its tropical Gulf Coast climate, it was named after prominent railroad developer Henry B. Plant (see Plant System). Plant City is known as the winter strawberry capital of the world and hosts the annual Florida Strawberry Festival in the late winter (usually in February or early March), which is attended by people from all over the United States as well as many people from around the world.

History
Plant City's original name given during the middle 1800s was Ichepuckesassa (also known as Idasukshed) after the Indian village that once occupied the territory. Its name caused so much confusion that the city was renamed "Cork", after the postmaster's Irish hometown. It was finally given the name "Plant City" in commemoration of Henry B. Plant and his railroad, which significantly boosted the commerce in this primarily agricultural community by incorporating it with the South Florida Railroad.

Plant City was the spring training home of baseball's Cincinnati Reds, who played exhibition games at Plant City Stadium from 1988 to 1997.

Geography

Plant City is located in northeastern Hillsborough County at  (28.0142, –82.1289). Interstate 4 runs through the northern part of the city, with access from Exits 17 through 25. I-4 leads east  to Lakeland and west  to Tampa. U.S. Route 92 is the main highway through the center of Plant City, running generally parallel to I-4. Florida State Road 39 crosses US 92 in the center of Plant City and leads north  to Zephyrhills and south  to Hopewell.

The city and its surrounding area are in the Southern Flatwoods ecological community as defined by the US Department of Agriculture. The region as a whole is noted for its sandy, infertile, and poorly drained soils. In and around Plant City, however, high organic matter content and scattered phosphate nodules make many of the soils more fertile than typical for the flatwoods.

Climate

Plant City, as does most of Florida, has a humid subtropical climate with humid and hot summers and warm, drier winters.

Education

The Hillsborough County School District operates all public schools in Plant City.

Public schools

 Simmons Career Center (6–12)
 Durant High School (9–12)
 Plant City High School (9–12)
 Strawberry Crest High School – Dover, FL (9–12)
 Simmons Exceptional Center (K–12)
 Teen Parent East Program (K–12)
 Tomlin Middle School (6–8)
 Turkey Creek Middle School (6–8)
 Marshall Middle School (6–8)
 Plant City Adult Learning Lab (GED Prep)
 Walden Lake Elementary (K–5)
 Burney Elementary School (preK–5)
 Stonewall Jackson Elementary (K–5)
 Cork Elementary School (K–5)
 Woodrow Wilson Elementary (K–5)
 Knights Elementary School (K–5)
 Springhead Elementary School (K–5)
 Trapnell Elementary School (K–5)
 Bryan Elementary School (K–5)

Private schools

 Autumn Leaf Academy (PK)
 Evangelical Presbyterian Church Learning Center (PK)
 First Presbyterian Learning Center II (PK–K)
 Faith Christian Academy of Plant City (K–12)

Bruton Memorial Library 
The Quintilla Geer Bruton Memorial Library is located in Plant City and was built in 1960. It is a part of the Tampa-Hillsborough County Public Library Cooperative but is under the jurisdiction of the City of Plant City. There are 44,000 members as of 2014.

Bruton Memorial Library offers programs for children, young adults, and adults. Bruton Memorial Library also offers free access to multiple databases, tutoring websites, ebooks, emagazines, and movie streaming. Computers are available for use, as are laptops that can be used only within the library. A variety of activities and services are available to a variety of patrons, from book clubs to extensive workshops regarding the beginnings and upkeep of the cultivation of homes and gardens, as well as crafts available on Mondays and hobbyists convening for fabric arts like knitting or crocheting two Fridays a month. Crafts also extend to children and teens as well.

Economy
Wish Farms, the largest strawberry producer in Florida, has a large presence in Plant City.

Demographics

2020 census

As of the 2020 United States census, there were 39,764 people, 13,966 households, and 9,699 families residing in the city.

2000 census
As of the census of 2000, there were 29,915 people, 10,849 households, and 7,843 families residing in the city. The racial makeup of the city was 71.67% White, 17.42% Hispanic or Latino of any race, 16.16% African American, 0.37% Native American, 0.89% Asian, 0.04% Pacific Islander, 9.10% from other races, and two or more races were 1.77% of the population.

There were 10,849 households, out of which 36.9% had children under the age of 18 living with them, 52.7% were married couples living together, 14.8% had a female householder with no husband present, and 27.7% were non-families. 22.9% of all households were made up of individuals, and 9.3% had someone living alone who was 65 years of age or older. The average household size was 2.73 and the average family size was 3.20.

In the city, the population was spread out, with 29.4% under the age of 18, 8.9% from 18 to 24, 29.1% from 25 to 44, 20.2% from 45 to 64, and 12.3% who were 65 years of age or older. The median age was 33 years. For every 100 females, there were 93.0 males. For every 100 females age 18 and over, there were 89.3 males.

The median income for a household in the city was $37,584, and the median income for a family was $43,328. Males had a median income of $33,417 versus $23,585 for females. The per capita income for the city was $18,815. About 11.3% of families and 14.7% of the population were below the poverty line, including 22.1% of those under age 18 and 13.3% of those age 65 or over.

Transportation

Aviation

Railroad
Plant City Union Depot served both the Atlantic Coast Line Railroad (ACL) and Seaboard Air Line Railroad even after their merger into the Seaboard Coast Line Railroad until passenger service ceased operations in 1971.  It has been on the National Register of Historic Places since 1975.  The east-west ACL tracks cross the north-south Seaboard tracks at a 90-degree angle at the southeast corner of the station, forming a diamond junction.  Both tracks are now owned and run by Class 1 railroad CSX.  Amtrak's Silver Star uses the line's west-to-eastbound ACL tracks, although it does not stop at the station.

At the station, a train observation deck is present where one can watch CSX freight trains and Amtrak's Silver Star train pass.  The closest other passenger stations are Tampa or Lakeland.

Major highways
 Interstate 4
 U.S. Route 92
 State Road 39
 State Road 39A
 State Road 553
 State Road 566
 State Road 574

Law enforcement

The Plant City Police Department (PCPD) is the law enforcement agency for the city of Plant City. The annual budget for the police department for 2017-2018 was $10,413,994.

Parks, culture, recreation and attractions

National Register of Historic Places
There are several locations in Plant City which have been included in the National Register of Historic Places. They are:

Bing Rooming House
Downtown Plant City Commercial District
Downtown Plant City Historic Residential District
Glover School
Hillsboro State Bank Building
Historic Turkey Creek High School
North Plant City Residential District
Plant City High School
Plant City Union Depot
Standard Oil Service Station

Attractions
Dinosaur World

Parks
Alderman's Ford Regional Park
Edward Medard Park and Reservoir, a 1,284 acre preserve with 3.25 mile bridle path, fishing, and trails.

Alafia River State Park is located nearby.

Mural ban

On October 12, 2009, the Plant City Commissioners voted 4-to-1 to essentially ban all new murals in the Historic District of Plant City. Current murals being painted are not affected by this ban, but no new murals can be painted unless the owner of the building can prove there was an already existing mural on the wall before 1994. The ban was set in motion by a complaint that a recent mural by Blake Emory—a rendition of Norman Rockwell's "April Fools"—contained a sex organ in the painting. Even though the creators of the mural insisted it was not intentional, and immediately altered the section of the mural, City Commissioners hastily cast the vote adding that they may revisit this ban in the future. City Commissioner Bill Dodson was the only vote against the ban saying he was looking for a more thought out and complete ordinance over an immediate and outright ban.

Notable people
Quintilla Geer Bruton, library advocate and philanthropist
John Keasler, columnist who wrote 7,000 columns over 30 years for The Miami News.
Ashley Moody, attorney and 38th Attorney General of Florida
Clay Roberts, professional soccer player and coach
Pam Tillis, country singer

Sister cities

Plant City has formalized sister city agreements with the following city:

Notes

References

External links

Plant City official website

 
Cities in Hillsborough County, Florida
Cities in Florida
1885 establishments in Florida
Populated places established in 1885